Santa Bárbara is one of the 18 departments (departamentos) into which Honduras is divided. The departmental capital is Santa Bárbara.

Geography
The department covers a total surface area of 5,115 km² and, in 2005, had an estimated population of 368,298 people.

Economy

The department, historically, is known for harvesting mahogany and cedar trees for exportation.

Municipalities

 Arada
 Atima
 Azacualpa
 Ceguaca
 Chinda
 Concepción del Norte
 Concepción del Sur
 El Nispero
 Gualala
 Ilama
 Las Vegas
 Macuelizo
 Naranjito
 Nueva Frontera
 Nuevo Celilac
 Petoa
 Protección
 Quimistán
 San Francisco de Ojuera
 San José de Colinas
 San Luis
 San Marcos
 San Nicolás
 San Pedro Zacapa
 Santa Bárbara
 Santa Rita
 San Vicente Centenario
 Trinidad

Notes

References

 
Departments of Honduras